AF Hotel Group is a well known hotel chain in Azerbaijan. It is a four-star hotel chain and aqua park resorts in centre of Baku and Novkhani Baku, which is 21 kilometres from the centre of Baku. 
The hotel chain has 1009 rooms which makes it second largest hotel chain in Baku, Azerbaijan.

See also
AF Holding

References

External links
Official site of AF Hotel Group
Official site of AF Hotel Aquapark Novkhani
Official site of AF Holding

Hotels in Azerbaijan
Water parks in Azerbaijan